Coldwater is a city and county seat of Comanche County, Kansas, United States.  As of the 2020 census, the population of the city was 687.

History
In 1884 G.W. Vickers conceived the idea of laying out a town in the northern part of Comanche County, in company with Timothy Shields, J. P. Grove, Samuel Sisson, C. M. Cade and C. D. Bickford, all from Harper County. They preempted a section of land, had it platted off as a town site and named it after the city of Coldwater, Michigan. Early the following year the county had the required number of inhabitants, who petitioned the governor for its organization, and on February 27, 1885, it was organized with Owen Connaughton, George M. Morris and David T. Mclntire, commissioners and R. A. Grossman, clerk. Coldwater was designated as the county seat.

The first post office in Coldwater was established on October 17, 1884.

Geography

Climate
The climate in this area is characterized by hot, humid summers and generally mild to cool winters.  According to the Köppen Climate Classification system, Coldwater has a humid subtropical climate, abbreviated "Cfa" on climate maps.

Area attractions
 Comanche County Historical Museum, 105 West Main Street.
 Chief Theater (NRHP), 122 East Main Street.
 Comanche County Courthouse (NRHP), 201 South New York Avenue.

Demographics

2010 census
As of the census of 2010, there were 828 people, 380 households, and 217 families residing in the city. The racial makeup of the city was 97.2% White, 0.1% African American, 0.2% Native American, 0.1% Asian, 0.1% Pacific Islander, 0.2% from other races, and 1.9% from two or more races. Hispanic or Latino of any race were 2.5% of the population.

There were 380 households, of which 26.8% had children under the age of 18 living with them, 45.5% were married couples living together, 7.6% had a female householder with no husband present, 3.9% had a male householder with no wife present, and 42.9% were non-families. 39.5% of all households were made up of individuals, and 18.9% had someone living alone who was 65 years of age or older. The average household size was 2.12 and the average family size was 2.81.

The median age in the city was 46.1 years. 23.3% of residents were under the age of 18; 5.7% were between the ages of 18 and 24; 19.2% were from 25 to 44; 26.8% were from 45 to 64; and 25.1% were 65 years of age or older. The gender makeup of the city was 47.5% male and 52.5% female.

2000 census
As of the census of 2000, there were 792 people, 380 households, and 209 families residing in the city. The racial makeup of the city was 98.11% White, 0.13% African American, 0.63% Native American, 0.13% Pacific Islander, 0.13% from other races, and 0.88% from two or more races. Hispanic or Latino of any race were 2.15% of the population.

There were 380 households, out of which 20.3% had children under the age of 18 living with them, 46.6% were married couples living together, 8.4% had a female householder with no husband present, and 45.0% were non-families. 42.9% of all households were made up of individuals, and 28.2% had someone living alone who was 65 years of age or older. The average household size was 2.01 and the average family size was 2.75.

In the city, the population was spread out, with 20.3% under the age of 18, 5.4% from 18 to 24, 17.9% from 25 to 44, 24.6% from 45 to 64, and 31.7% who were 65 years of age or older. The median age was 50 years. For every 100 females, there were 80.8 males. For every 100 females age 18 and over, there were 76.8 males.

The median income for a household in the city was $27,167, and the median income for a family was $36,786. Males had a median income of $23,438 versus $16,625 for females. The per capita income for the city was $16,851. About 8.7% of families and 9.8% of the population were below the poverty line, including 8.8% of those under age 18 and 8.9% of those age 65 or over.

Education
The community is served by Comanche County USD 300 public school district.  South Central High School is located in Coldwater.

Coldwater High School closed because of school unification.

Infrastructure

Transportation
U.S. Route 160 and U.S. Route 183 passes through Coldwater.

Notable people
 Chick Brandom, baseball player
 Harold Herd, former Kansas Supreme Court justice (1979–1993), minority leader in Kansas State Senate (1969–1973), mayor of Coldwater (1950–1954), officer in the U.S. Navy during World War II.

See also
 National Register of Historic Places listings in Kansas

References

Further reading

External links

 City of Coldwater
 Coldwater - Directory of Public Officials
 Coldwater City Map, KDOT

Cities in Kansas
County seats in Kansas
Cities in Comanche County, Kansas